The 1992 South Carolina Gamecocks football team represented the University of South Carolina in the 1992 NCAA Division I-A football season.  This was the first season for the Gamecocks as a member of the Southeastern Conference (SEC). In 1992 the SEC expanded to twelve teams and two divisions with South Carolina placed in the SEC East Division. The Gamecocks were led by Sparky Woods, in his fourth season as head coach, and finished the season with a 5–6 record.  After beginning the season 0–5, Steve Taneyhill assumed the starting quarterback position and led the Gamecocks to a 5–1 finish, with wins vs. ranked foes Mississippi State and Tennessee.

Schedule

Roster
Steve Taneyhill – QB;
Blake Williamson – QB;
Desi Sargent - QB;
Brandon Bennett – RB;
Stanley Pritchett – RB;
Rob DeBoer – FB;
Matthew Campbell – TE;
Boomer Foster – TE;
Toby Cates – WR;
Don Chaney – WR;
Asim Penny – WR;
James Dexter – OL;
Delvin Herring – OL;
Kevin Rosenkrans RT;
Ernest Dye – LT;
Ernest Dixon – LB;
Aubrey Brooks – LB;
Lawrence Mitchell – LB;
Chris Rumph – LB;
Hank Campbell – MLB;
Eric Sullivan – DT;
David Turnipseed – DE;
Frank Adams – DB;
Tony Watkins – DB;
Rocky Clay – CB;
Norman Greene – Safety;
Marty Simpson – Kicker;
Derwin Jeffcoat – Punter

References

Additional sources
 Griffin, J. C. (1992). The first hundred years: A history of South Carolina football. Atlanta: Longstreet Press

South Carolina
South Carolina Gamecocks football seasons
South Carolina Gamecocks football